Big Ups was an American post-hardcore band formed in Brooklyn, New York, in 2010. It was founded by lead singer Joe Galarraga, guitarist Amar Lal, bassist Carlos Salguero and drummer Brendan Finn.

History

Eighteen Hours of Static (2014–2015) 
On January 13, 2014 Big Ups released their debut album Eighteen Hours of Static through Dead Labour and Tough Love Records for North America and the UK/Europe respectively. The album received reviews from mainstream websites such as Pitchfork and Stereogum. Paul Thompson of Pitchfork gave the album a positive review, saying "Throughout Eighteen Hours of Static, arty Brooklyn post-punkers Big Ups' howling debut LP, vocalist Joe Galarraga and company put the world on notice. For 28 minutes, no grievance goes unaired, and no blood's left unlet."

Before a Million Universes  (2016–2017) 
On March 4, 2016 Big Ups released their sophomore album Before a Million Universes through Exploding in Sound Records and Tough Love Records for North America and the UK/Europe respectively.

Two Parts Together and hiatus (2018–2019) 
On May 18, 2018 Big Ups released their third album Two Parts Together through Exploding in Sound Records.

In November, 2018 Big Ups announced an indefinite hiatus, stating “Since 2010, the four of us have dedicated ourselves to this project in a way that often neglects other aspects and dimensions of ourselves and our lives,” they wrote in a statement. “It’s time for us to branch out and grow.” They played their final show on January 18, 2019 at New York City's Bowery Ballroom.

Musical style 
The band have primarily been described as post-hardcore, post-punk and indie rock.

Band members 

 Brendan Finn –  drums
 Joe Galarraga – lead vocals
 Amar Lal – guitar
 Carlos Salguero – bass guitar

Discography 

 Studio albums

Singles

Music videos

References 

American post-hardcore musical groups
Musical groups from Brooklyn
Musical groups established in 2010
2010 establishments in New York City